Młynisko  is a settlement in the administrative district of Gmina Prabuty, within Kwidzyn County, Pomeranian Voivodeship, in northern Poland.

For the history of the region, see History of Pomerania.

See also
Młynisko, Greater Poland Voivodeship (west-central Poland)
Młynisko, Łódź Voivodeship (central Poland)
Młynisko, Masovian Voivodeship (east-central Poland)

References

Villages in Kwidzyn County